Krzysztof Surlit (13 October 1955 - 23 September 2007) was a Polish footballer.

Career

Surlit was known for his free-kick ability, which were regarded as one of the best in Polish history. During one match, he told the defensive wall, "You better step back, because I can hurt you" before deliberately hitting the wall which resulted in a goal. With Widzew, he helped eliminate Manchester United from the 1980-81 UEFA Cup with a free kick goal, and scored two goals against Juventus in 1982/83.

After retiring, Surlit became a coach in the Polish lower leagues, but was frustrated that they could not do what was obvious to him.

References

External links
Krzysztof Surlit at 90minut

Polish footballers
Association football midfielders
1955 births
2007 deaths
People from Bełchatów County
Poland under-21 international footballers
Widzew Łódź players
Nîmes Olympique players
USL Dunkerque players
GKS Bełchatów players
Polish expatriate footballers
Expatriate footballers in France
Polish expatriate sportspeople in France
Expatriate footballers in Finland
Polish expatriate sportspeople in Finland
Oulun Työväen Palloilijat players